Lukáš Dvořák (born 1982) is a Czech photographer.

Career
His artwork has been published by a number of fashion magazines, including Vogue, Harper's Bazaar, Marie Claire, Vanity Fair, Cosmopolitan, as well men's magazines, Playboy and GQ. He has a strong preference for black and white photography in his work, which is highly contrasting and striking. His images are characterized by an intense emotional and sensually erotic charge. He is inspired by travelling the world in search of places with the most beautiful light. Location and light are as important to him as the charismatic and feminine types of models he photographs.

Bibliography
2010: First Impression (164 p., self-published)

Exhibitions
2004: Lukáš Dvořák – Galerie Nora, Prague, Czech Republic
2005: New Zealand – Café-Bar-Galerie Hidden, Prague, Czech Republic 
2005: Lukáš Dvořák – Palackého náměstí, Prague, Czech Republic 
2005: New Zealand – Kulturní centrum Novodvorská, Prague, Czech Republic 
2009: Lukáš Dvořák – Kongresové Centrum, Prague, Czech Republic
2010: First Impression, Leica Gallery Prague, Prague, Czech Republic
2010: Festival Internationale de la photographie de mode, Cannes, France
2011: Lukáš Dvořák, Prague Photo Festival, Prague, Czech Republic
2012: Festival International de la photographie de mode, Cannes, France
2013: Lukáš Dvořák, Embassy of the Czech Republic, Accra, Ghana
2013: Nudes, Galerie Vinicni Altan, Prague, Czech Republic
2017: Nudes, Galerie Vnitroblok, Prague, Czech Republic
2021: Jizerská 50 viděna šesti, Leica Gallery Prague, Prague, Czech Republic

Further reading

References

External links

Lukáš Dvořák at The Creative Finder
Lukáš Dvořák on FOTO pátračka

Lukáš Dvořák on Leica Gallery Prague

1982 births
Living people
Photographers from Prague